Bethel High School is a high school located in Bethel Acres, in Pottawatomie County, Oklahoma. It serves approximately 400 students and is part of the Bethel School District.

History
Bethel Acres was opened to non-Indian settlers during the Land Run of 1891. Early settlers set up the school district; classes were held in a brush arbor until a wood-frame building was erected at the corner of Clear Pond and Bethel roads.

Sports
Bethel High School is mainly Class 3A. The slowpitch team is 5A. The school's mascot is the Wildcats and school colors are blue, gold, and white.

References

External links

Bethel High School

Public high schools in Oklahoma
Schools in Pottawatomie County, Oklahoma